The 2010 Legg Mason Tennis Classic was a tennis tournament played on outdoor hard courts. It was the 42nd edition of this event and was part of the ATP World Tour 500 series of the 2010 ATP World Tour. It took place at the William H.G. FitzGerald Tennis Center in Washington, D.C., USA, from August 1 through August 8, 2010. Unseeded David Nalbandian, who entered the main draw on a wildcard, won the singles title.

ATP entrants
List of Association of Tennis Professionals (ATP) singles entrants, as of July 26, 2010.

Seeds

Other entrants
The following players received wildcards into the singles main draw
  James Blake
  David Nalbandian
  Fernando Verdasco
  Richard Gasquet

The following players received entry from the qualifying draw:
  Brian Dabul
  Kevin Kim
  Igor Kunitsyn
  Kei Nishikori
  Ryan Sweeting
  Grega Žemlja

Finals

Singles

 David Nalbandian defeated  Marcos Baghdatis, 6–2, 7–6(7–4)
It was Nalbandian's first title of the year and 11th of his career.

Doubles

 Mardy Fish /  Mark Knowles defeated  Tomáš Berdych /  Radek Štěpánek, 4–6, 7–6(9–7), [10–7]

References

External links
Official website

 
2010 ATP World Tour
2010
2010 in sports in Washington, D.C.